Live Life Loud (stylized as LIVE*LIFE*LOUD!) is the fourth studio album from Christian rock band Hawk Nelson. It was released on September 22, 2009. According to Daniel Biro, the dog on the cover is lead vocalist Jason Dunn's dog Murphy. The album was packaged with a pair of 3D glasses that are needed to be worn to view the album's CD booklet which is printed in 3D.
The album peaked at No. 54 the first week on Billboard 200 and at No. 3 on The Billboard Christian Albums charts.

Concept and musical style
Bassist Daniel Biro describes the album as "really about encouraging our fans to do just that. To live your life loud, to embrace all that life brings your way and experience every moment of it to the fullest extent. This is the message we want our fans to come away with after they hear the album."

The album is the first time that the band wrote songs together by just jamming as a band, although the band collaborated with Chris Stevens, Matthew Gerrard, TobyMac, Trevor McNevan, and Bart Millard on the record.

Track listing

Personnel
 Jason Dunn - lead vocals
 Daniel Biro - bass guitar, backing vocals
 Jonathan Steingard - guitar, backing vocals
 Justin Benner - drums

Awards

In 2010, the album was nominated for a Dove Award for Recorded Music Packaging of the Year at the 41st GMA Dove Awards. The title song was also nominated for Short Form Music Video of the Year.

References

Hawk Nelson albums
2009 albums
BEC Recordings albums
Tooth & Nail Records albums